The UEFA Nations League is a biennial international football competition contested by the senior men's national teams of the member associations of UEFA, the sport's European governing body. The first season has begun in September 2018 consisting of four groups in each of the four leagues ranked by UEFA coefficient of each country.
 
The Republic of Ireland has been in Division B, since the beginning of this tournament.

UEFA Nations League record

*Denotes draws including knockout matches decided on penalty kicks.
**Gold background colour indicates that the tournament was won.
***Red border colour indicates tournament was held on home soil.

2018–19 UEFA Nations League B Group 4

2020–21 UEFA Nations League B Group 4

2022–23 UEFA Nations League B Group 1

References

External links
Republic of Ireland at UEFA Nations League

Countries at the UEFA Nations League
Republic of Ireland national football team – record in major tournaments